Boniabad (also Romanized as Bonīābād; also known as Banī) is a village in Baqeran Rural District, in the Central District of Birjand County, South Khorasan Province, Iran. At the 2006 census, its population was 37, in 13 families.

References 

Populated places in Birjand County